Agnes of Burgundy may refer to:
 Agnes of Burgundy, Duchess of Aquitaine (died 1068)
 Agnes of France, Duchess of Burgundy (c. 1260 – 1327)
 Agnes of Burgundy, Duchess of Bourbon (1407–1476)